is a Japanese footballer for FC Machida Zelvia in the J2 League.   His regular playing position is centre-back.   He has previously had spells with Roasso Kumamoto, Júbilo Iwata, Kyoto Sanga,  Montedio Yamagata and Gamba Osaka.

Club career

A native of Osaka, Suganuma came through the youth team ranks at Gamba Osaka and earned his first professional contract ahead of the 2009 season.   In total he spent 3 years in the Gamba first-team squad and had only 2 AFC Champions League appearances to show for it.   He was loaned out to J2 League outfit Roasso Kumamoto for the second half of the 2011 season and played 17 times as the men from Kyushu finished in 11th place.

Suganuma joined Júbilo Iwata in 2012 and played 21 league games in his first season which saw them finish in mid-table.   However the following year he featured just 16 times as Júbilo were relegated to J2.   They would stay in Japan's second tier for just one season with Suganuma featuring 17 times as they were promoted via the playoffs.

Júbilo moved up to J1 League in 2015, however Suganuma would spend the next 3 seasons in J2, first with Kyoto Sanga before moving north to link up with Montedio Yamagata in 2017.   His consistent performances once again brought him to the attention of Gamba Osaka who re-signed him in 2018.

Suganuma spent most of his first season back in Osaka on the substitutes bench as back up to the first-choice centre-back pairing of Genta Miura and Fábio but he did manage to rack up 16 appearances in total, 11 in the league and 5 in the J.League Cup, helping Gamba to finish 9th and reach the quarter-finals in those respective competitions.   Additionally he had a brief spell playing with Gamba's Under-23 side in J3 League, making 5 appearances and scoring once.

National Team career

He was a member of the Japan squad for the 2009 East Asian Games and won a gold medal with Japan under-23 in the 2010 Asian Games in Guangzhou.

Club statistics
Updated to 2 December 2018.

Reserves performance

Last Updated: 2 December 2018

References

External links

 

1990 births
Living people
Association football people from Osaka Prefecture
People from Toyonaka, Osaka
Japanese footballers
J1 League players
J2 League players
J3 League players
Gamba Osaka players
Gamba Osaka U-23 players
Roasso Kumamoto players
Júbilo Iwata players
Kyoto Sanga FC players
Montedio Yamagata players
FC Machida Zelvia players
Asian Games medalists in football
Footballers at the 2010 Asian Games
Asian Games gold medalists for Japan
Medalists at the 2010 Asian Games
Association football defenders